I, Said the Spy is a 1980 thriller novel by the British writer Derek Lambert.

References

Bibliography
 Burton, Alan. Historical Dictionary of British Spy Fiction. Rowman & Littlefield, 2016.

1980 British novels
Novels by Derek Lambert
British thriller novels